James E. Newell was a member of the Wisconsin State Assembly.

Biography
Newell was born on March 6, 1808, in Richland Township, Belmont County, Ohio. He moved to Viroqua (town), Wisconsin, in 1854. During the American Civil War, Newell was a member of the 50th Wisconsin Volunteer Infantry Regiment of the Union Army. He was a first lieutenant.

Political career
Newell was a member of the Assembly during the 1875 session. Other positions he held include District Attorney and County Judge of Vernon County, Wisconsin. He was a Republican.

References

People from Belmont County, Ohio
People from Viroqua, Wisconsin
Republican Party members of the Wisconsin State Assembly
District attorneys in Wisconsin
Wisconsin state court judges
People of Wisconsin in the American Civil War
Union Army officers
1808 births
Year of death missing